Bristol is a city in and the county seat of Liberty County, Florida, United States. It is the only incorporated city in Liberty County. The population was 996 at the 2010 census, up from 845 at the 2000 census. Two schools are based in Bristol: Liberty County High School and W. R. Tolar Elementary and Middle School.

Geography
It sits atop a  bluff overlooking the east side of the Apalachicola River. Florida State Road 20 passes through the city, leading west  to Blountstown and east  to Tallahassee, the state capital. Florida State Road 12 leads northeast from Bristol  to Greensboro.

Climate 
Like all of North Florida, Bristol has a humid subtropical climate (Köppen Cfa) with hot, uncomfortably humid summers, and comfortable to warm winters.

Demographics

As of the census of 2000, there were 845 people, 326 households, and 235 families residing in the city. The racial makeup of the city was 87.22% White, 3.79% African American, 1.78% Native American, 5.44% from other races, and 1.78% from two or more races. Hispanic or Latino of any race were 5.80% of the population.

There were 326 households, out of which 30.7% had children under the age of 18 living with them, 52.8% were married couples living together, 14.1% had a female householder with no husband present, and 27.9% were non-families. 25.8% of all households were made up of individuals, and 12.0% had someone living alone who was 65 years of age or older. The average household size was 2.48 and the average family size was 2.91.

In the city, the population was spread out, with 24.9% under the age of 18, 8.5% from 18 to 24, 25.6% from 25 to 44, 24.5% from 45 to 64, and 16.6% who were 65 years of age or older. The median age was 39 years. For every 100 females, there were 88.2 males. For every 100 females age 18 and over, there were 87.3 males.

The median income for a household in the city was $31,607, and the median income for a family was $36,932. Males had a median income of $26,473 versus $22,500 for females. The per capita income for the city was $17,949. About 14.8% of families and 19.8% of the population were below the poverty line, including 24.9% of those under age 18 and 15.5% of those age 65 or over.

Veterans Memorial Park
One notable feature of the park is the  narrow gauge Veterans Memorial Railroad, operating multiple types of locomotives including a coal-powered steam locomotive built by Crown Metal Products.

Claimed Garden of Eden site
A widely reported claim was once made by Elvy E. Callaway that the site of the Biblical Garden of Eden lay in northern Liberty County. He cited as evidence the Apalachicola River, with its four heads, and local sources of torreya (which Callaway claimed was gopher wood, the material said to have been used by Noah in constructing his ark).

References

External links

The Calhoun-Liberty Journal, local newspaper
The Calhoun-Liberty Journal full text and images, available at no cost in Florida Digital Newspaper Library
Veterans Memorial Railroad

Cities in Liberty County, Florida
County seats in Florida
Cities in Florida
Former census-designated places in Florida
Populated places established in 1859
1859 establishments in Florida